Miami Freedom Park is a proposed 25,000-seat soccer-specific stadium to be built in Miami, Florida, United States as the home of Major League Soccer team Inter Miami CF. In spring 2022, final approval was given by the city of Miami to build a stadium on the current site of the Melreese golf course, close to Miami International Airport. The decision followed a long process in which numerous locations were considered for the stadium. The current plans would see the stadium opened for the 2025 MLS season.

Location search

PortMiami (2014)

On March 25, 2014, Beckham announced plans to build a 25,000-seat stadium at PortMiami, adjacent to the Miami Heat's American Airlines Arena (now known as Miami-Dade Arena) in the Downtown area of the city. Under the proposal, the stadium would have been located at the southwest corner of Dodge Island and be accessible by a pedestrian bridge from Biscayne Boulevard and the American Airlines Arena.

On April 8, 2014, Miami-Dade commissioners refused to let PortMiami relocate a fuel-spill facility that would have needed to move in order to accommodate the stadium and entertainment complex.  The stadium plan called for a commercial complex where the facility is located. Royal Caribbean Cruises Ltd, who had previously proposed developing on the same site, formed the Miami Seaport Alliance (MSA), a coalition of companies and unions based in the port, and led the opposition to the stadium plan. Political strategist Joe Slade White created an advertising campaign for MSA, which later won a national award for best public affairs advertising, claiming that a stadium would worsen traffic problems and interfere with the port's plans to expand and handle increased cargo. Beckham's real estate adviser argued that Royal Caribbean opposed the stadium plan because it paid below-market rates on its lease at the port.

Facing political pressure, Beckham's group announced that the PortMiami site had become "Plan B", and Miami-Dade County commissioners voted 11–1 against building the stadium at PortMiami on May 20, 2014.

On February 3, 2015, in a move that was described as symbolic, county commissioners voted unanimously to recommend FIU Stadium as a temporary home for the expansion team. Commissioner Juan C. Zapata, who sponsored the item, said "I think we did [Beckham] a big disservice. I know that when I've met with him, I have apologized, because I think we could have treated him better."

Museum Park (2014)

On May 5, 2014, with the PortMiami proposal facing fierce opposition, Miami-Dade County Mayor Carlos A. Giménez proposed an alternate location on the waterfront, by filling a boat slip between American Airlines Arena and Museum Park. Giménez wrote in a letter to Beckham's real estate adviser that "Downtown Miami would greatly benefit" from a waterfront park that included the stadium and pedestrian walkways. The land, owned by the city of Miami, would have had to be sold or conveyed to the county, and Miami Mayor Tomás Regalado said filling the slip "would be a monumental task." Giménez and Regaldo discussed filling the slip in December 2013, but said the land was not being considered for a soccer stadium.

Following a meeting with Mayors Regalado and Gimenez, Beckham's group announced on May 19, 2014, that the boat slip location had become "Plan A". The site required approval from the commissioners of the city and county, who both owned parts of the land needed for the stadium, and the city charter required a public vote. According to plans presented by Beckham's group on May 22, 2014, the 20,000-seat stadium would take up  of the  park, while adding  by filling the deep-water basin.

The Miami Marlins had considered the boat slip location for its new stadium, but rejected the plan, as it would have cost millions of dollars to pump out water and transport rocks from elsewhere to fill the slip.

Critics warned the stadium would put a strain on area roads and pipes and others criticized using a public parkland for a stadium, and residents of nearby condominiums expressed concerns that the stadium may obstruct the ocean view.

After the city reported that the two sides were "too far apart" in negotiations over rent, Mayor Regalado and City Manager Daniel Alfonso turned down the proposal on June 10, 2014, and the proposal was rejected.

Little Havana (2014–15)

MLS president Mark Abbott said in June 2014 that the league was not interested in building in Little Havana next to Marlins Park, now known as LoanDepot Park (although the initial plans included a soccer stadium to be built alongside it, a plan supported by the league in 2008).

In February 2015, Miami-Dade County commissioner Xavier Suárez suggested two previously proposed sites – next to Marlins Park and on the Miami River near Miami International Airport. Suárez told the Miami New Times that he had already discussed the latter location with Beckham's advisor and the developer who owns the land, previously a Bertram Yacht boatyard. Suárez said both locations fit a broad interpretation of the league's insistence on a "downtown" location and the Marlins Park location's "taint" had faded.

On March 4, 2015, Miami-Dade County commissioners passed a resolution calling on Mayor Gimenez to negotiate with Beckham's group over a county-owned parcel of land on the west side of Marlins Park.

On July 17, 2015, Miami Mayor Tomás Regalado announced a tentative deal to build the park on city-owned land next to Marlins Park, pending approval from city commissioners. However, in November 2015, Commissioner Francis Suarez said it was taken off the city commission agenda for December 1, 2015, where approval was required to get the stadium on the March 2016 ballot. Suarez cited Beckham's group's inability to secure deals with private landowners.

When the team was announced in March 2014, Miami International Airport, Marlins Park and Florida International University were mentioned as alternative sites should downtown stadium plans fall through.

Cities in neighboring Broward County were asked in July 2014 to forward a list of possible locations for a stadium and the county previously offered a county-owned site next to the BB&T Center in Sunrise as a possible site. Before the team was announced, Palm Beach County Sports Commission contacted Beckham's group and proposed FAU Stadium for the team.

The ownership group released a statement saying that a downtown Miami site was still preferred, but added, "there are other cities that would welcome an MLS club owned by [Beckham] and his partners."

In August 2014, Commissioner Don Garber told Alexi Lalas of ESPN that the league "will not expand to Miami unless we have a downtown site for the stadium."

In May 2015, University of Miami President Donna Shalala met with Beckham and his group to discuss a possible joint stadium for the MLS team and the Miami Hurricanes football team. Shalala said Sun Life Stadium, the existing home stadium with a capacity of over 65,000, was too big for the Hurricanes, but at the same time their target size of around 44,000 seats was too big for MLS.

Overtown (2015–18)

On December 4, 2015, Beckham's group announced it had secured a contract to purchase a privately owned block in Overtown at 650 NW 8th Street near Culmer station, Interstate 95, and Miami River. It also secured a letter of intent from Miami-Dade Mayor Carlos Giménez to negotiate the purchase of the block to the south, owned by the county. The Overtown site was the fourth proposed location announced by Beckham since the expansion team was awarded to Miami, but this was the first time the group dropped its attempt to avoid paying property taxes by having the city or county serve as the stadium's landlord. On December 5, the MLS governing board endorsed the location, and on March 24, 2016, it was reported by the Miami Herald that Beckham's group completed the purchase of the privately owned land portion needed for the soccer stadium.

However, after Jorge Mas, who leads the South Miami construction and engineering firm MasTec with his brother Jose, joined Beckham's team, it announced it planned to abandon the Overtown site for a larger development near Miami International Airport.

Freedom Park (2018–present)

In July 2018, Beckham and Mas unveiled plans for a 25,000-seat stadium as part of Freedom Park, a mixed-use complex at the site of the city-owned Melreese Country Club near the airport. The owners would also make annual installment payments of $20 million for 30 years for improvements to public parks across the city. City commissioners voted to approve a referendum on the November 2018 ballot that would ask if the city should negotiate a no-bid lease with the investors. The measure passed with 60% of the vote, and will next require four out of five votes from city commissioners.

Owing to concerns over the plan, the PGA Tour Latinoamérica moved the Shell Championship season-ending event from Melreese to Trump National Doral Miami Golden Palm in October 2018.

Beckham announced in June 2019 that Freedom Park has a proposed launch date 2022.
This has been approved by the results of a referendum in which 60% of the voters authorized the stadium. Also Miami-Dade Circuit Judge Mavel Ruiz's decision, preserved the results of a November referendum in which 60% of Miami voters authorized city administrators to negotiate a 99-year lease with the MLS team's ownership to develop Miami Freedom Park. The team would also build an adjacent public park. The MLS team, Club Internacional de Fútbol (Inter Miami), would play at least 17 home games annually in the 25,000-seat stadium.

On August 20, 2019, Miami Mayor Francis Suarez confirmed a recent report that soil contamination at Melreese golf course, the proposed site for the stadium, was far worse than previously thought. According to CBS Miami, "...arsenic contamination levels are more than twice what is allowed by law. Barium and lead levels are also too high and there is debris in the soil that could cause physical hazards."

On April 28, 2022, the Miami City Council voted 4–1 to grant Inter Miami a 99-year lease for the Melresse site, with the stadium projected to open in the 2025 MLS season.

On March 19, 2023, Melreese Golf Course was shut down to make way for the construction of Miami Freedom Park.

Transportation

The Freedom Park site is located near Miami International Airport and the adjoining Miami Intermodal Center, a rail and bus transfer station. It is served by Metrorail trains to Downtown Miami and Tri-Rail commuter rail to the northern suburbs and counties. The Intermodal Center is located on the north side of the canal that separates the stadium site from the airport.

References

External links
Official Site

Sports venues in Miami
Major League Soccer stadiums
Proposed stadiums in the United States
Soccer venues in Florida
stadium
Arquitectonica buildings